Melissa A. Schilling is an American innovation scholar and professor. She holds the John Herzog Family chair in management and organizations at NYU Stern, and she is also the Innovation Director for Stern's Fubon Center for Technology, Business and Innovation. She is world known as an expert in innovation, is the author of the leading innovation strategy text, Strategic Management of Technological Innovation (now in its 5th edition), and is a coauthor of Strategic Management: An Integrated Approach (now in its 12th edition). She is also the author of Quirky: The remarkable story of the traits, foibles, and genius of breakthrough innovators who changed the world. She and her work have been featured on NPR's Marketplace, Bloomberg BusinessWeek, Entrepreneur, Inc., Harvard Business Review, Huffington Post, CNBC, Scientific American, and USA Today, among others. She also speaks regularly at national and international conferences as well as corporations on strategy and innovation.

Biography 
Melissa Schilling earned her PhD in strategic management from the University of Washington. Her research focuses on innovation and strategy in high technology industries such as smartphones, videogames, pharmaceuticals, biotechnology, electric vehicles, and renewable energies. Much of her work has focused on technology trajectories, collaboration networks and modularity. Her interest in medical innovation also led her to study neurodegenerative diseases, and she has published an influential article on the relationship between Alzheimer's and diabetes.

Professor Schilling has won numerous awards such as the 2003 National Science Foundation's CAREER Award  and the Best Paper in Management Science and Organization Science for 2007.  She has served on the National Academy of Sciences Committee on "Overcoming the Barriers to Adoption of Electric Vehicles," and currently serves on the Advisory Board of the American Antitrust Institute.

Selected publications
 Schilling, M.A. 2000. "Towards a general modular systems theory and its application to inter-firm product modularity". Academy of Management Review, vol. 25:312-334. 
 Schilling, M.A., & C. Phelps. 2007. "Interfirm collaboration networks: The impact of large-scale network structure on firm innovation", Management Science, 53: 1113-1126.
 Schilling, M.A., & M. Esmundo. 2009. "Technology s-curves in renewable energy alternatives: Analysis and implications for industry and government". Energy Policy, 37:1767-1781.
 Schilling, M.A. 2015. "Technology shocks, technological collaboration, and innovation outcomes". Organization Science, 26:668-686.
 Schilling, M.A. 2015. Strategic Management of Technological Innovation, 5th edition. Boston: McGraw Hill. In English, Spanish, Korean, Chinese (long form and short form), Italian, and Greek.
 Schilling, M.A. 2018. Quirky: The Remarkable Story of the Traits, Foibles, and Genius of Breakthrough Innovators who Changed the World. New York: Public Affairs.

Citations 

Year of birth missing (living people)
Living people
New York University faculty
University of Washington alumni
University of Colorado Boulder alumni